Kabirpur is a large village in Sidhwalia, Gopalganj district, Bihar, India, with a population of 3400 as of 2011.

References

Villages in Gopalganj district, India